Kingdom of Fear may refer to:

Kingdom of Fear (book), a 2003 book by Hunter S. Thompson
Kingdom of Fear (Shitdisco album), 2007
Kingdom of Fear (In Battle album), 2007

See also
Empire of Fear: Inside the Islamic State
Republic of Fear